Budapesti Gyárépítők SE was a Hungarian association football club from the town of Budapest. The club was founded as Zuglói Athletikai Club in 1911. In 1950 the club merged to Budafoki MTE.

History
Zuglói Athletikai Club debuted in the 1922–23 season of the Hungarian League and finished ninth. In 1923 the club merged with the Zuglói VII. Kerületi SC and changed its name to Zuglói VII. Kerületi AC. In the next season the club was the sixth. In the 1924–25 season the club finished the penultimate 11th place and dropped to the II league.

Name Changes 
1911: Zuglói Athletikai Club
1911: merger with Zuglói Testvériség Sport Club
1911–1915: Zuglói Sport Club
1915: merger with Turul Sport Egyesület
1915–1919: Zuglói Turul Sport Club
1919–1920: Zuglói Munkás Testedző Egyesület
1920–1923: Zuglói Atlétikai Club
1923: merger with Zuglói VII. Kerületi SC
1923–1926: Zuglói VII. Kerületi AC
1926: foundation of a mutual club with Fővárosi TK 
1926–1932: Turul FC
1932–1949: Zuglói Atlétikai Club
1949: Budapesti Gyárépítő
1949–1950: Budapesti Gyárépítők SE
1950: merger with Budafoki MTE

Managers
 Gábor Obitz (1945–?)

References

External links
 Profile

Football clubs in Hungary
1911 establishments in Hungary